Established in 1999, the Central States Developmental Hockey League (CSDHL) is a competitive league organized for elite Tier II ice hockey teams within Illinois and the Central States region. It is sanctioned by USA Hockey. Often referred to as the best AA league in North America, the CSDHL offers competitive travel hockey at the Midget, Bantam, Pee Wee, and Squirt levels.

Teams
 Affton Americans
 Chesterfield Falcons
 Chicago Blues
 Chicago Bruins
 Chicago Bulldogs
 Chicago Hawks
 Chicago Jets
 Cyclones Amateur Hockey Association
 Highland Park Falcons Hockey Association
 Glenview Stars
 Golden Wolves Hockey
 Hyland Hills Hockey Association
 Ice Dogs Hockey Association
 Leafs Hockey Club
 Littleton Hawks (Colorado)
 Northern Express
 Northwest Chargers Hockey Association
 Orland Park Vikings
 Pekin Dragons
 Rink Side Vipers 
 Rockford Hockey Club
 Sabre Hockey Association
 St. Jude Knights Hockey Club
 St.Louis Eagles 
 St.Louis Sting 
 St.Louis Knights 
Winnetka Hockey Club
Wilmette Hockey Association

Recent champions

References

External links
Central States Developmental Hockey League

Ice hockey leagues in the United States